Jed Allan Brown (March 1, 1935 – March 9, 2019), known professionally as Jed Allan, was an American actor and television host, best known as C.C. Capwell on Santa Barbara, Don Craig on Days of Our Lives,  Rush Sanders on Beverly Hills, 90210, Scott Turner on Lassie, Harold Johnson on The Bay, and the host of Celebrity Bowling.

Life and career

Education and early career
Allan attended the University of Washington, where he majored in Drama. While in college, he supported himself working as a radio and television announcer and sportscaster. In the 1960s, he appeared in several Broadway productions such as Viva Madison Avenue!, Oliver!, and Barefoot in the Park.

Daytime television roles
Allan starred in several soap operas. He made his debut as trouble-making Ace Hubbard on Love of Life in 1964. He played college professor Paul Britton on The Secret Storm in 196465. Allan was one of many actors to play Paul, who was involved with the show's leading heroine, Amy Ames. Allan replaced his future Santa Barbara co-star Nicolas Coster in the part.  He is best known for his role as Don Craig in Days of Our Lives, which he played from 1971 to 1985, his exit taking place as many of the show's veteran cast members were being written out so the show could focus on younger characters. His departure from Days of Our Lives was unpopular among his fans. His character was abruptly written out with minor explanation. He gained a new audience when he took over the role of C. C. Capwell in Santa Barbara from 1986 to 1993. After his time on Santa Barbara, Allan had a recurring role in Beverly Hills, 90210 playing Rush Sanders.

In 2004, he started playing the role of Edward Quartermaine in General Hospital.

Other projects
Allan's most notable television role outside of soap operas was when he starred on Lassie from 1968 to 1970 as Forest Ranger Scott Turner, who along with fellow ranger Bob Erickson (played by Jack De Mave) served as the collie dog's main human companion during that period.

He appeared in numerous made-for-television movies. He hosted Celebrity Bowling during the 1970s as well as a game show pilot, Temptation, in 1981 for Ralph Andrews and Columbia Pictures Television.

Allan was a featured character in several episodes of Adam-12. He played Reno West, a prolific burglar who was known as, "Take a little, leave a little" because of his M.O. He was finally caught by Reed and Malloy in the episode 'Capture' (season 6, episode 9).

Allan wrote a book, Please, Spell the Name Right, in reference to  his name often being spelled incorrectly. The book is about his experiences of 50 years as an actor working with other actors and was released in November 2004.

Personal life and death
Allan was married to Toby Brown from September 21, 1958 until her death in 2001. The couple had three sons, Mitch, Dean, and Rick. Allan lived in Palm Desert, California.

He died on March 9, 2019, eight days after his 84th birthday.

Filmography

References

External links
 
 
 

1935 births
2019 deaths
American male film actors
American male television actors
American male soap opera actors
American male stage actors
Bowling broadcasters
Male actors from New York City
People from Palm Desert, California
Jewish American male actors
University of Washington College of Arts and Sciences alumni
21st-century American Jews